Stade Marcel-Deflandre is a sports stadium in La Rochelle, France. It was built by Emile Sourcile. It is the home ground of rugby union team Stade Rochelais of the Top 14 who have played there since it was opened in 1926. It has undergone significant redevelopment since 1995 and the present capacity is 16,000 (2,500 added during summer 2014). The stadium is named after Marcel Deflandre, a president of the club who was executed in 1944 during the Second World War.

External links
Stade Marcel-Deflandre attendances

Marc
Rugby union stadiums in France
Buildings and structures in La Rochelle
Tourist attractions in La Rochelle
Sports venues completed in 1926
Stade Rochelais